Southern Brave is a franchise 100-ball cricket side based in the city of Southampton. The team represents the historic counties of Hampshire and Sussex in the newly founded The Hundred competition, which took place for the first time during the 2021 English and Welsh cricket season. Both the men's side and the women's side play at the Rose Bowl, Hampshire.

History 

The announcement of the new eight-team men's and women's tournament series in 2019 was not without controversy, with the likes of Virat Kohli criticising the England and Wales Cricket Board for pursuing a shift away from Test cricket, while others argued the format should have followed the established and successful Twenty20 format. The ECB, however, decided it needed a more distinctive format to draw crowds.

In August 2019 the side announced that former Sri Lanka batsman and 2019 IPL winning coach Mahela Jayawardene would be the men's team's first coach, while former England Women captain Charlotte Edwards was appointed coach of the Women's team. Jayawardene will be assisted by former two former Hampshire players: Former New Zealand international bowler Shane Bond and former opening batsmen and current coach of Hampshire 2nd XI Jimmy Adams, while Richard Halsall will also assist the men's side.

The inaugural Hundred draft took place in October 2019 and saw the Brave claim Jofra Archer as their headline men's draftee, and Anya Shrubsole as the women's headliner. They are joined by England international James Vince and Chris Jordan for the men's team, while Danielle Wyatt joins Shrubsole on the women's side.

Honours

Men's honours 

The Hundred
Winners: 2021

Women's honours 

The Hundred
Runners-up: 2021, 2022

Ground 

Both the Southern Brave men's and women's sides play at the home in Hampshire County Cricket Club, the Ageas Bowl, in West End, a short distance outside of Southampton. The women's side had been due to play at the home in Sussex County Cricket Club, the County Ground in Hove, but both teams were brought together at the same ground as a result of the COVID-19 pandemic.

Players

Current squad

Men's side 
 Bold denotes players with international caps.
  denotes a player who is unavailable for rest of the season.

Men's captains
 Italics denote a temporary captain when the main captain was unavailable.

Women's side 
 Bold denotes players with international caps.
  denotes a player who is unavailable for rest of the season.

Women's captains
 Italics denote a temporary captain when the main captain was unavailable.

Seasons

Group stages

Knockout rounds

See also 

 List of Southern Brave cricketers
 List of cricket grounds in England and Wales
 List of Test cricket grounds

References

Further reading 

 BBC: The Hundred player draft – covering the first draft signings for each region's team

External links 

 Official web page

Hampshire County Cricket Club
Sussex County Cricket Club
Cricket in Hampshire
Cricket in Sussex
Sport in Southampton
Sport in East Sussex
The Hundred (cricket) teams
2019 establishments in England
Southern Brave